The 2017–18 EBU Player of the Year Championship was the competition's fourth season. Points were accumulated over the EBU's ten most prestigious events from 1 October 2017 to 30 September 2018. Mike Bell won his first title, becoming the fourth player to win the championship.

List of Competitions

Summary of Results

This list displays the top ten players (including ties); 130 players received points. Winners of each event are highlighted in bold.

References

Contract bridge competitions
Contract bridge in the United Kingdom